Recipients of the Order of the Netherlands Lion and, until 1830, its counterpart the Order of the Lion Belgium.

The Order of the Netherlands Lion is a high order of chivalry of the Kingdom of the Netherlands. The Order of the Netherlands Lion was until recently awarded upon eminent individuals from all walks of life, including generals, ministers of the crown, mayors of large towns, professors and leading scientists, industrialists, high ranking civil servants, presiding judges and renowned artists. Since 1980 the Order has been primarily used to recognise merit in the arts, science, sport and literature. The following are recipients within the award.

Knight Grand Cross

Royalty
(List incomplete)

Politics and Military
(List incomplete)

Commander
(List incomplete)

Knight
(List incomplete)

References